"Interweb" is a song recorded by American singer Poppy from her debut studio album, Poppy.Computer, which was released on October 6, 2017. It was released on July 17, 2017 by Mad Decent Records as the fourth single from the record.

Composition 
"Interweb" is an electro-infused new wave and 1990s-inspired EDM song with a length of three minutes and forty nine seconds. It moves at a tempo of 114 beats per minute in a 4/4 time signature. The song's instrumentation features a basic house beat and a disco bassline. The song features "internet-obsessive" lyrics.

Critical reception 
Benjamin Groff of We Are The Guard wrote that the song "is a mockery of Taylor Swift Illuminati conspiracy theories, as well as bleaker, sadder realities - the isolation, depression, and searching common to so many of us." Jake Visnawath of Paper wrote that "Poppy seems to own her possessive powers for the first time in the track." Golden Boy Press wrote that the character of Poppy "doesn't disappear even when she sings, she keeps it going in a way that's new, fresh, and interesting."

Music video 
The music video for "Interweb" was released on July 21, 2017. The visual piece features the singer under dark technicolor red and blue lights as two figures dance in the background. Paper magazine wrote that the video's dancers "practically perform hypnosis over the Web." Jordan Miller of Breathe Heavy called the video "beautifully bizarre."

Live performances 
Poppy made her late night debut on The Late Late Show with James Corden on August 2, 2017, where she performed the single. "Interweb" was also on the setlist for the 2017-18 Poppy.Computer Tour.

Track listing 
Taken from iTunes.

Release history

References

2017 singles
2017 songs
Mass media about Internet culture
Poppy (entertainer) songs
Songs written by Simon Wilcox
Songs written by Titanic Sinclair